Shrimp are stalk-eyed swimming crustaceans.
Shrimp may also refer to:

Food
Shrimp (food), a shellfish used as food
 Barratts Shrimps, a British candy in the shape of a shrimp

People
 Lloyd Andrews (1894-1974), a Canadian National Hockey League player nicknamed "Shrimp"
 Albert Burns (motorcyclist) (1898-1921), American dirt and board track motorcycle racer nicknamed "Shrimp"
 Michael Chambers (born 1967) American dancer and actor nicknamed "Boogaloo Shrimp"
 Henry Thomas Davies (1914–2002), English lifeboatman nicknamed "Shrimp"
 H. D. G. Leveson Gower (1873-1954), English cricketer nicknamed "Shrimp"
 Jean Shrimpton (born 1942), English former supermodel nicknamed "The Shrimp"

Military
 SHRIMP, the device detonated in the 1954 Castle Bravo American nuclear test
 Saro Shrimp, a 1930s British experimental flying boat
 Operation Shrimp, a 1977 attempted coup led by mercenary Bob Denard in Benin
 , a United States Navy patrol vessel in commission from 1917 to 1918

Sports
 Shrimp, term for an escape in grappling wherein one mimics the locomotion of the crustacean
 Morecambe FC, English football club nicknamed The Shrimps

Other uses
 Sensitive high-resolution ion microprobe (SHRIMP), a material analysis instrument primarily used for geological and geochemical applications
 Shrimp (dinghy), a Canadian boat design
 Shrimps (brand), British fashion brand founded by Hannah Weiland
 The Shrimp, a children's novel by Emily Smith

Lists of people by nickname